Survived and Punished (stylized as Survived & Punished or S&P) is an American national volunteer-run organization that campaigns for the abolition of custodial sentences for victims of abuse who defended themselves from their attacker. The organization focuses on preventing the imprisonment of people who have been victims of assault, estimated to comprise almost 90% of women in United States' prisons, of whom most are arrested for defending themselves from domestic and intimate partner violence.

The organization has branches in Chicago, New York, and California. Survived & Punished at large initially grew out of efforts from abolitionist organizers like Mariame Kaba to free Marissa Alexander. The Chicago branch is now titled "Love & Protect" and it was previously known as the "Chicago Alliance to Free Marissa Alexander", while the New York and California branches are referred to as S&P NY and S&P California respectively. Local groups operate autonomously but report regularly to S&P National in order to affirm chapter alignment with organizational goals.

Notable cases
 Marissa Alexander case
 Chrystul Kizer case

See also 
Battered Woman Syndrome
Domestic Violence
Outline of domestic violence
Violence against women

References

External links 
 Official website

Non-profit organizations based in the United States
Organizations established in 2016
Advocacy groups in the United States
Anti-racist organizations in the United States
Criminal justice reform in the United States
Prison abolition movement
Prison-related organizations